Ntoitha M'mithiaru was a Kenyan politician. He belonged to the Party of National Unity and was elected to represent the Igembe North Constituency in the National Assembly of Kenya since the 2007 to 2013 Kenyan parliamentary election. He holds an MBA from Kenyatta University. He is married with four children.

References

he defeated Maoka Maore of Kanu
the constituency was formerly called Ntonyiri

Living people
Meru people
Year of birth missing (living people)
Party of National Unity (Kenya) politicians
Members of the National Assembly (Kenya)